Don't Be Offended Beatrice (Spanish:No te ofendas, Beatriz) is a 1953 Mexican film. It was written by Luis Alcoriza.

External links
 

1953 films
1950s Spanish-language films
Mexican black-and-white films
Mexican romance films
1950s romance films
1950s Mexican films